Lidia Borda (born 1966) is an Argentine tango singer.
 
Lidia Borda whom the Rolling Stone described as “the best tango singer of the present” is regarded as the best female voice in the last decades, and she has been widely acclaimed. Lidia has been inspired by the pioneer interpreters of tango but at the same time she is a modern and original interpreter with a classic and unconventional repertoire that rescues beautiful pages of the genre, inexplicably forgotten.

Life
Born in Buenos Aires, Lidia Borda studied Fine Art, Music and Theatre. Though she had been singing since her adolescence, it was in 1995 that she decided to dedicate herself entirely to singing tango, (those times with her brother -tango guitar player- Luis Borda who actually lives in Germany) of which she has become one of the most important modern interpreters as a “rare bird” that cannot be pigeonholed with the standards in vogue after the 60s, located in a place near the great female tango singers of previous times

Borda has toured internationally in America and Europe and played at many of the main festivals around the world, including Grec, Spain; Festival de Otoño, Portugal; Citè de la musique, Chaillot, France; and  The Bergen Festival, Norway. In 2002, she represented Argentina singing in representation of LatinAmerica at the opening ceremony of the New Library of Alexandria in Egypt. In 2005 she was awarded the Konex prize “Merit Diploma” in the category Female Tango Singer.

Discography
 Un ramito de Cedrón [2008]
 Tal vez será su voz (with Orquesta El Arranque)
 Entre sueños
 Será una noche (with La Segunda)
 Patio de tango (with Brián Chambouleyron - Esteban Morgado)
 Hecho

References

External links

Lidia Borda at Todo Tango

1966 births
20th-century Argentine women singers
Argentine tango musicians
Living people
People from San Martín, Buenos Aires
21st-century Argentine women singers